Lars Henrik Nilsson (born 25 July 1972) is a Swedish former footballer who played as a defender. He represented Sweden at the 1992 Summer Olympics in Barcelona.

References

External links 
 

1972 births
Living people
Association football midfielders
Swedish footballers
Sweden youth international footballers
Allsvenskan players
Malmö FF players
Landskrona BoIS players